Sam Walton (born 1980s in London) is a British peace activist and, as of March 2020, Chief Executive of Free Tibet and Tibet Watch. He is most well known for his arrest on 29 January 2017 at Warton Aerodrome, Lancashire on suspicion of criminal damage after attempting to "disarm war planes" which he believed were bound for Saudi Arabia.

Walton is a Quaker and used to work for Quaker Peace and Social Witness.

Activism

Art the Arms fair 
In September 2017 Walton was a key organiser of 'Art the arms fair' an art exhibition designed to coincide with the Defence and Security Equipment International arms fair, it was supported by many artists including Banksy via a donated a piece called Civilian Drone Strike.

Attempted citizen's arrest of Ahmad Asiri 

On 30 March 2017 Walton attempted a citizen’s arrest on Ahmad Asiri who was visiting London, citing accusations of war crimes in Yemen. Due to the protests and attempted arrest, the UK Foreign Secretary Boris Johnson phoned Saudi Arabia’s Crown Prince Mohammed bin Salman to apologize.

Attempt to disarm fighter jets at Warton Aerodrome 

On 29 January 2017 Walton and Methodist minister Dan Woodhouse were arrested after entering the British Aerospace Warton Aerodrome site after an attempt to disarm by damaging the Typhoon fighter jets stored there that they believed were bound for the Royal Saudi Air Force and therefore to be used in the Saudi Arabian-led intervention in Yemen. The action was inspired by the Seeds of Hope group of the Plowshares movement who damaged a Hawk fighter jet in 1996.

In October 2017 Walton and Woodhouse appeared at Burnley Magistrates court facing charges of criminal damage; both were found not guilty after successfully arguing that they acted for the greater good.

Interruption of Vince Cable speech  
On 26 April 2012 Walton interrupted the Business Secretary Vince Cable’s address at a UK Trade & Investment Defence & Security Organisation (UKTI DSO) Symposium. Walton took to the stage to condemn the promotion of the arms industry.

Count Me Out campaign 
Throughout 2011 & 2012 Walton was involved in 'Count Me Out', a group who opposed to the company Lockheed Martin’s involvement in the UK 2011 census.

Publications 

 In October 2017 Walton and Woodhouse co-authored an article "Even the UK courts believe our arms sales to Saudi Arabia are wrong – which is why we were acquitted of criminal damage this week" in The Independent's Voices section.
 In 2014 Walton authored the briefing "The New Tide of Militarism" for Quaker Peace & Social Witness.

References

External links 

 Interruption of Vince cable's speech
 Interview in OpenDemocracy 
 Speaking to the United Nations on human rights in Bahrain
 BBC News coverage of criminal damages trail

English pacifists
People from London
English Quakers
Year of birth missing (living people)
Living people